Michael Coles may refer to:

 Michael Coles (speedway rider) (born 1965), British speedway rider
 Michael Coles (cricketer) (born 1981), English cricketer
 Michael Coles (actor) (1936–2005), English actor
Michael Coles (businessman), American businessman
 Mike Coles (born 1944), New Zealand cricketer

See also
Michael Cole (disambiguation)